Joseph Han Yingjin (born 1958) is a Chinese Catholic priest and Bishop of the Roman Catholic Diocese of Sanyuan since June 24, 2010.

Biography
Han was born into a Catholic family in Xianyang, Shaanxi in 1958.  Han joined the Catholic priesthood seminary in 1986. He was ordained a priest in 1992. In 1993 he was appointed parish priest. Later He studied at two universities. In 2007 he was nominated as a diocesan candidate. In 2008, Pope Benedict XVI gave his approval. He became Bishop of the Roman Catholic Diocese of Sanyuan on June 24, 2010. His predecessor, Bishop Joseph Zong Huaide, was the chief secretary, other bishops who participated the ordination were Anthony Dang Mingyan, Louis Yu Runchen, Joseph Tong Changping, Nicholas Han Jide and Joseph Li Jing. All were approved by the Holy See and the Communist government.

References

1958 births
Living people
People from Xianyang
21st-century Roman Catholic bishops in China